The Siemens mercury unit is an obsolete unit of electrical resistance. It was defined by Werner von Siemens in 1860 as the resistance of a mercury column with a length of one metre and uniform cross-section of  held at a temperature of zero degrees Celsius. It is equivalent to approximately 0.953 ohm.

Glass tube cross sections are typically irregularly conical rather than perfect cylinders, which presented a problem in constructing precise measuring devices. One could make many tubes and test them for conical regularity, discarding the least regular ones; their regularity can be measured by inserting a small drop of mercury into one end of the tube, then measuring its length while sucking it along. The cross-sectional area at each end can then be measured by filling the tube with pure mercury at a fixed temperature, weighing it, and comparing that weight to the relative lengths of the mercury drop at each end. The tube can then be used for measurement by applying a formula obtained from these measurements that corrects for its conical shape.

The Siemens mercury unit was superseded in 1881 by the ohm; the name "siemens" was later reused for a unit of electric conductance.

References

External links
Units named after Siemens

Units of electrical resistance
Mercury (element)
Obsolete units of measurement
Werner von Siemens